Robert Chaloner may refer to:

 Robert Chaloner (priest) (died 1621), Canon of Windsor
 Robert Chaloner (MP) (1776–1842), English Member of Parliament and Lord Mayor of York